The Suzhou Lida Middle School is located in Suzhou, Jiangsu Province, China. It is the de facto affiliated middle school of Suzhou High School. It is a private school subsidized by the city government between 2006 and 2012, and was transformed to a public school in 2012.

Schools in Suzhou